Seyf ol Din-e Sofla (also Romanized as Seyf ol Dīn-e Soflá and Seyf od Dīn-e Soflá; also known as Seyf od Dīn) is a village in Akhtachi Rural District, in the Central District of Bukan County, West Azerbaijan Province, Iran. At the 2006 census, its population was 143, in 26 families.

References 

Populated places in Bukan County